Ilja van Leerdam (born August 8, 1978) is a Dutch former professional footballer who last played for North American Soccer League club FC Edmonton as a midfielder.

Career
Van Leerdam debuted for Helmond Sport on August 13, 1999 in a home match against FC Groningen. He played sixty league games during his two-year run with Helmond Sport in which he scored 16 goals. In 2001, Van Leerdam signed a four-year contract with Eredivisie side De Graafschap.

From 2001 to 2005, Van Leerdam played in the two highest divisions of Dutch football with De Graafschap, appearing in 118 league matches in which he scored 9 goals. He attracted attention of several clubs in his native country, and was signed by hometown club FC Eindhoven in 2005. In January 2007, Van Leerdam rejoined Helmond Sport.

Van Leerdam signed with FC Edmonton of the North American Soccer League in July 2011. He is under contract with FC Edmonton for the 2012 season.

References

External links
 Helmond Sport Profile
 FC Edmonton Profile

1978 births
Living people
De Graafschap players
Dutch footballers
Eerste Divisie players
Eredivisie players
Van Leerdam, Ilja
FC Eindhoven players
Van Leerdam, Ilja
Helmond Sport players
Van Leerdam, Ilja
Footballers from Eindhoven
Association football midfielders
Dutch expatriate footballers
Dutch expatriate sportspeople in Canada
PSV Eindhoven players